Darbar (also known as Delbar) is a village in Howmeh Rural District, in the Central District of Bam County, Kerman Province, Iran. At the 2006 census, its population was 93, in 27 families.

References 

Populated places in Bam County